AXIS Capital Holdings Limited  is the holding company for AXIS group of companies. It offers various risk transfer products and services through subsidiaries and branch networks in Bermuda, the United States, Canada, Europe and Singapore. The company offers insurance services including property, professional lines, terrorism, marine, energy, environmental and other insurance. The reinsurance services include property, professional lines, credit and bond, and others.

History
AXIS Capital Holdings Limited was founded in Pembroke, Bermuda in 2001.

In February 2004, the company formed a healthcare unit providing professional liability insurance.

In June 2015, AXIS and PartnerRe Ltd started a public campaign to convince shareholders of the positive aspects of a potential $13 billion merger between the two companies, with competition seen from Exor SpA, which bid $6.8 billion.

In 2017 Axis Capital has completed its acquisition of Novae Group P.L.C and Aviabel S.A.

In February 2020, AXIS Capital Holdings chairman of the board and co-founder Michael Butt announced his retirement after five decades in the insurance business. AXIS board member and lead independent director Henry B. Smith has been appointed as successor to the chairmanship post.

Offices
Axis Capital has offices in New York, Alpharetta (US), Toronto, Halifax, Chicago, Champaign (IL, US), Bermuda, Dublin, Zurich, Paris, London (UK) and Singapore.

Managers
President & CEO - Albert A. Benchimol

References

External links

Financial services companies established in 2001
Companies listed on the New York Stock Exchange
Holding companies of Bermuda
Insurance companies of Bermuda
Holding companies established in 2001
2001 establishments in Antigua and Barbuda